Ronald Earle Glass (July 10, 1945 – November 25, 2016) was an American actor. He was known for his roles as literary Det. Ron Harris in the television sitcom Barney Miller (1975–1982), and as the spiritual shepherd, Shepherd Book, in the science fiction series Firefly (2002) and its sequel film Serenity (2005).

Early life
Glass was born in Evansville, Indiana, the son of Lethia and Crump Glass.

After graduating from St. Francis Seminary in 1964, Glass attended the University of Evansville, where he received a Bachelor of Arts, double majoring in drama and literature. Years later, the university awarded him its Medal of Honor. Glass said in 2007 he knew while he was in college that he wanted to act. With a teacher's encouragement, he performed in a play and went on to an acting career.

Career

Glass made his stage debut at the Guthrie Theater in Minneapolis, Minnesota, before moving to Hollywood. His earliest TV appearances include episodes of Sanford and Son in 1972, an episode of Hawaii Five-O in 1973, an episode of Maude in 1973, an episode of All in the Family in 1973, an episode of The Bob Newhart Show, and episodes of Good Times in 1974. In 1975, he landed the role of Det. Ron Harris in Barney Miller, which ran until 1982.

The following season, Glass co-starred with Demond Wilson on television in a remake of The Odd Couple, called The New Odd Couple. On December 13, 1985, he played a soul-collecting devil opposite Sherman Hemsley's mathematics professor in an episode of the revived Twilight Zone series. In 1992, he co-starred in the sitcom Rhythm and Blues, a kind of "black WKRP, playing "the fifth Top" opposite Roger Kabler.

In 1996, Glass was cast as uptight history teacher Roland Felcher in NBC sitcom Mr. Rhodes opposite comedian Tom Rhodes. In 1999, he appeared in two episodes of NBC sitcom Friends as Ross Geller's divorce lawyer, Russell.

After that, Glass appeared in dozens of television series, including sitcoms such as Family Matters and the series Teen Angel, where he played God's cousin Rod. He had a guest appearance in the Star Trek: Voyager episode "Nightingale". He was a series regular in the science fiction series Firefly (2002) and the sequel film Serenity (2005), in which he played Derrial Book, a Christian "Shepherd" with a mysterious past. Glass provided the voice of Randy Carmichael for the Nickelodeon series All Grown Up! and Rugrats, and the character Garth in the video game Fable II. In 2008 he appeared in the film Lakeview Terrace alongside Samuel L. Jackson and starred in the 2010 version of Death at a Funeral as Duncan.

Personal life and death
Glass never married, was a devout Buddhist, and a member of Soka Gakkai International. He died of respiratory failure on November 25, 2016, at the age of 71. He is interred at the Rose Hills Memorial Park in Whittier, California.

Filmography

Film

Television

Video games

References

External links

1945 births
2016 deaths
African-American male actors
American male television actors
American male voice actors
American male film actors
Burials at Rose Hills Memorial Park
20th-century American male actors
21st-century American male actors
Male actors from Indiana
Actors from Evansville, Indiana
University of Evansville alumni
American Buddhists
20th-century African-American people
21st-century African-American people
Deaths from respiratory failure